The Hungry is a 2017 Indian drama film directed by Bornila Chatterjee. It was filmed by London-based cinematographer Nick Cooke. It was screened in the Special Presentations section at the 2017 Toronto International Film Festival and is a modern adaptation of Titus Andronicus by William Shakespeare.

Cast
 Naseeruddin Shah as Tathagat Ahuja
 Tisca Chopra as Tulsi Joshi
 Antonio Aakeel as Chirag Joshi
 Neeraj Kabi as Arun Kumar
 Sayani Gupta as Loveleen Ahuja
 Arjun Gupta as Sunny Ahuja
 Suraj Sharma as Ankur Joshi
 Jayant Kripalani as Poddaar

References

External links
 

2017 films
2017 drama films
Indian drama films
British drama films
British Indian films
Films based on Titus Andronicus
Films about corruption in India
Modern adaptations of works by William Shakespeare
2010s Hindi-language films
Hindi-language drama films
Indian films based on plays
British films based on plays
2010s English-language films
2010s British films